Maksim Viktorovich Shorkin (born 3 September 1990) is a Russian professional football player. He plays for FC Neftekhimik Nizhnekamsk.

Club career
He made his debut in the Russian Football National League for FC KAMAZ Naberezhnye Chelny on 26 March 2012 in a game against FC Baltika Kaliningrad.

External links
 Career summary at sportbox.ru  
 
 Profile by Football National League

1990 births
People from Cheboksary
Sportspeople from Chuvashia
20th-century Russian people
21st-century Russian people
Living people
Russian footballers
Association football defenders
FC KAMAZ Naberezhnye Chelny players
FC Tyumen players
FC Volga Ulyanovsk players
FC Torpedo Moscow players
FC Mordovia Saransk players
FC Neftekhimik Nizhnekamsk players
Russian First League players
Russian Second League players